Geraint Griffiths (born 1949) is a Welsh singer-songwriter and actor. He works mainly in the Welsh language.

Early life and education
Born in Pontrhydyfen, Griffiths attended Pontrhydyfen Primary school and then moved across to Ysgol Gymraeg Pontrhydyfen when it opened. In 1960 he attended Glan Afan Grammar Technical School in Port Talbot (later Glan Afan Comprehensive School). In 1966 he left to study nursing at The Prince of Wales Orthopaedic Hospital, Rhydlafar, and later at West Wales General Hospital, Carmarthen, and at Saint George's Hospital, London.

Career
Griffiths started his recording career as a session musician with Welsh language bands Hergest and Edward H Dafis. In 1976 he returned to Wales to join the short lived band Injaroc, leaving one album Halen Y Ddaear. In 1978 he formed the Welsh language rock band Eliffant. The band recorded two albums on the Sain  label and a single on the band's own label, "Llef". In 1985 he started his professional career with his own six part television series on S4C, Nol Ar Y Stryd (Back On The Street). He released several albums of his compositions on the Sain label as a solo artist.

Recordings
 M.O.M.  (1979) with the band Eliffant.
 Gwin Y Gwan (1980) with the band Eliffant.
 Madras (1984)
 Rebel (1986)
 Ararat (1988)
 Blynyddoedd Sain 1977-1988 (1997) Compilation.
 Eliffant (2001) Compilation.
 Cadw'r Ffydd (2003) Compilation.
He recorded the Welsh language rock version of Handel's Messiah -Teilwng Yw'r Oen in 1984. He founded his own record label, Diwedd Y Gwt, in 1992. He has released several albums on this label.

 Donegal (1992)
 Hewl (1999)
 Glastir (2001)
 Miya-Jima (2005)
 Clwb Dydd Sadwrn (2007)
 Havana (2007)
 Brooklyn (2017)

Films
 Y Cloc (1986) Endaf Emlyn
 Ffair Roc (1986) Richard Powelko
 Fel Dail Ar Bren (1987) David Lyn
 Derfydd Aur (1989) Paul Turner
 Nel (1990) Richard Lewis
 Sant Mewn Storm (1994) 
 The Proposition (1996) Strathford Hamilton
 Dirgelwch Yr Ogof (2002) Endaf Emlyn

External links
 , BBC Music.
Official website; accessed 30 September 2014.
Biography on the Sain Recording Company website; accessed 30 September 2014.

Bibliography

1949 births
Date of birth missing (living people)
Living people
Welsh-language singers
People from Neath Port Talbot
People educated at Port Talbot County Boys' Grammar School
Welsh songwriters
Welsh male singers
Welsh male film actors
Welsh male television actors
British male songwriters